Vi Simpson (born March 18, 1946) is an American politician who is a former Democratic member of the Indiana Senate, representing the 40th District from 1984 to 2012. She was the Minority Leader of the Indiana Senate.

She was also the Democratic nominee for lieutenant governor, in the 2012 Indiana Gubernatorial Election, running with the former Speaker of the Indiana House of Representatives John R. Gregg. The Gregg/Simpson ticket lost in a narrow election to Mike Pence and Sue Ellspermann.

Political career

Simpson was first elected to the office of Monroe County Auditor in 1981. In 1984, Simpson was elected to the Indiana Senate.

Committee assignments

Rules & Legislative Procedure (Ranking Minority Member)
Health & Provider Services
Provider Services Subcommittee
Insurance & Financial Institutions
Insurance Subcommittee
Joint Rules

See also 
Indiana State Senator

References

External links
Archived official Indiana State Legislature webpage
May 8, 2012 Primary Election
Vi Simpson's Biography
Indiana State Senate elections, 2012
 

1946 births
Democratic Party Indiana state senators
Living people
Politicians from Bloomington, Indiana
Politicians from Los Angeles
Women state legislators in Indiana
21st-century American women